Lourdes Domínguez Lino was the defending champion, but chose not to participate.

Sofya Zhuk won the title, defeating Varvara Flink in an all-Russian final, 6–4, 6–3.

Seeds

Main draw

Finals

Top half

Bottom half

References 
 Main draw

Abierto Tampico - Singles